Minard's is a brand of liniment.

History 
Like other patent medicines, Minard's was sold by its creator with exaggerated claims. Dr. Levi Minard the King of Pain" from Hants County, Nova Scotia, created Minard's Liniment.  The cream is a special liniment for easing stiff, sore muscles, and aching backs.

Dr. Minard's preparation, which he developed in the 1860s from ingredients known to bring comfort and relief, became a popular home therapeutic. Its use became widespread throughout the Maritime provinces and in Newfoundland. The popularity of Minard's Liniment then pushed west into Quebec and Ontario, where it became known as the "King of Pain Relief" because of the immediate relief it brought.

The Minard's Liniment brand was acquired by Stella Pharmaceutical in 1998.

Active ingredients
Camphor: It is a natural analgesic from camphor trees (broad-leafed evergreen). Camphor stimulates the nerve endings in the skin, producing numbness at the site of application, reducing pain and discomfort in muscle joints and the area below the skin where applied.

Ammonia Water: an alkaline substance that helps alleviate burning sensations.

Medicinal Turpentine: Distilled from pine oil, it is a counter-irritant. A counter-irritant produces a mild, inflammatory reaction where applied in order to relieve more deep-seated pain or discomfort. It has analgesic properties and aids in stimulating circulation.

References

External links
 Official Minards Site
 Stella Pharmaceutical

1879 introductions
Patent medicines